The Saskatchewan Liberal Party is a liberal political party in the Canadian province of Saskatchewan.

The party was the provincial affiliate of the Liberal Party of Canada until 2009. It was previously one of the two largest parties in the province, along with the Saskatchewan New Democratic Party and its precursors on its left, before being eclipsed by the Progressive Conservative Party of Saskatchewan from the right and later deserted by several members who contributed to the establishment of the Saskatchewan Party, the new centre-right dominant in the province since 1997.

History

Early history
The party dominated Saskatchewan politics for the province's first forty years and provided six of the first seven Premiers who served between the province's creation in 1905 and World War II. Located on the middle of the political spectrum, it assiduously courted "ethnic" (i.e., non-British) voters and the organized farm movement. It refused to pander to "nativist" sentiment that culminated in the short, spectacular existence of the Ku Klux Klan in Saskatchewan in 1927–28. During the party's only spell out of power during this time following the 1929 election, it was the largest party in the Saskatchewan Legislative Assembly. It did not command a majority of seats and was relegated to the opposition benches after Progressives and independents decided to join with the Conservatives in a coalition government.

Varying fortunes (1944–1978)
In the 1944 election, however, Saskatchewan experienced a dramatic change when it elected the first democratic socialist government in North America under Tommy Douglas and the Co-operative Commonwealth Federation (CCF). The Liberals were nearly wiped off the map, dropping from a strong majority of 38 seats to only five—the second-worst defeat of a sitting government in the province's history. The Liberals moved to the political right and stay there since. The Liberals remained out of power for twenty years until Ross Thatcher's victory in 1964 election. Thatcher led the Liberals to re-election in 1967.

After the defeat of the Liberals in the 1971 election at the hands of the CCF's successor, the Saskatchewan New Democratic Party, the party remained the principal opposition party in the province, albeit with a dwindling number of seats. However, in the 1978 election, the Liberals were completely shut out of the Legislature for the first time. The Progressive Conservatives replaced them as the principal opposition party in Saskatchewan.

Comeback (1986–1996)
The Liberals didn't return to the Legislative Assembly until 1986, when party leader Ralph Goodale (later federal Deputy Liberal leader) was elected as the party's sole member.

The Liberals came under the leadership of future Lieutenant Governor Lynda Haverstock in 1989. The Liberals were only able to take limited advantage of the collapse of Grant Devine's scandal-ridden Conservative government in the 1991 election, but Haverstock was able to win her Saskatoon seat. Liberal candidate Anita Bergman also won a by-election in 1994.

In the 1995 election, the Liberals displaced the Progressive Conservatives to become the Official Opposition to the re-elected New Democratic government of Roy Romanow.

Dissent and decline (1996–2021)
Dissatisfaction within the Liberal caucus led to the resignation of Lynda Haverstock as party leader. On November 24, 1996, the Saskatchewan Liberal party elected Jim Melenchuk on the third ballot as party leader. In 1997, four Liberal Members of the Legislative Assembly (MLAs) joined forces with four MLAs from the Progressive Conservative Party of Saskatchewan to form the Saskatchewan Party.

The 1999 election reduced the Liberals to only four seats and third party status in the Legislature. The result in the fourth seat, Wood River, was later overturned; a by-election was held and won by Yogi Huyghebaert, the Saskatchewan Party candidate. The governing New Democrats, however, had only won exactly half the total seats, effectively leaving them with a minority government since the governing party is traditionally expected to provide the Speaker of the Legislature. Following secret negotiations, the NDP and three Liberals elected announced that they had formed a coalition government, the second such government in the province's history following the Conservative-led government of 1929-34. Under the terms of the coalition agreement, two Liberals, Jim Melenchuk and Jack Hillson, were then appointed to positions in the Cabinet while the third, Ron Osika, was elected Speaker of the Legislature. Rank-and-file Liberals were against the coalition government and called for a leadership convention. On 27 October 2001 Saskatchewan Liberals elected businessman David Karwacki as the new leader over Hillson, who had withdrawn from the coalition. Karwacki soon ordered the other two Liberal MLAs, Melenchuk and Ron Osika, to disband the coalition. They refused, left the party, sat as independent Members of the Legislative Assembly, continued in the coalition and eventually ran for re-election (in both cases, unsuccessfully) as NDP candidates in the 2003 election.

The internal party feud hurt Liberal fortunes, as did a polarized electorate. A poorly run election campaign left the party shut out of the Legislature in 2003, the first time in over 20 years in which the Liberal Party was unable to win a single seat. In the 2007 election the Saskatchewan Liberal Party was again shut out of the Legislature, this time finishing better than third only in Regina Walsh Acres. In that riding, the Saskatchewan Party (which won power from the NDP in this election) had been forced to withdraw its candidate after the close of nominations.

Karawacki resigned as Liberal leader one month later. Ryan Bater was ratified as the Liberal leader at the Liberal Party convention on 21 February 2009. At the same convention, the party passed a declaration of principles, which sought to reposition the Liberals as the party of "Personal Liberty, Free Enterprise, and Responsible Government". As well, a proposal was approved separating the federal and provincial Liberal parties in Saskatchewan into two independent organizations.

In the 2011 general election, the Liberals ran only nine candidates. Seven Liberals ran in Saskatoon while one ran in Regina, however, the party put most of their resources behind Bater's own attempt to win a seat in the Battlefords. The Liberals again failed to win a seat in the Legislature. Overall, they fell to fourth place behind the third-place finishing Green Party of Saskatchewan, polling 2,237 votes in the nine constituencies in which they were on the ballot. Of these votes, more than a third of were earned by Bater in the Battlefords, who nevertheless finished a distant third in his own riding. Besides Bater, only two out of the eight other Liberals running were able to out-poll their Green Party opponents for a distant third-place finish. The other six Liberals finished fourth, compared to only one who finished worse than third in 2007. The party's platform focused on cutting the provincial sales tax, curbing government expenditures and creating a sovereign wealth fund entitled the Saskatchewan Future Fund.

Ryan Bater resigned as leader on January 31, 2012. Greg Gallager was appointed interim leader on March 12, 2012. In the party's 2013 leadership election, Reid Hill was the only candidate to put his name forward by the close of nominations, and was thus to be named as the party's new leader. He decided not to take on the job, however, stating that he had wanted to partake a competitive race to revive public attention for the party, rather than simply being handed the leadership due to lack of interest. Darrin Lamoureux was appointed as new interim leader on December 16, 2013 and was acclaimed on August 21, 2014, when no other candidates ran for the position.

The party managed to field a full slate of 61 candidates for the 2016 general election. They were once again shut out of the Legislature, collecting about 3.6% of the vote. Lamoureux resigned as party leader on September 9, 2017. Tara Jijian was appointed interim leader later that month. Naveed Anwar was acclaimed as leader on May 5, 2018. Anwar resigned as leader in September 2020. Robert Rudachyk was appointed as the party's interim leader on September 28, 2020 ahead of the 2020 general election.

In the 2020 provincial election, the party won no seats in the legislature. It ran only three candidates and received only 355 total votes, or 0.08% of the popular vote.

Walters era (2021–present) 

Following the disastrous 2020 provincial election, the party set about looking for a new permanent leader. At the 2021 Party Convention in Davidson, members unanimously elected University of Regina lecturer, Jeff Walters. Walters ran on the slogan "New Way Forward", offering renewal for both the party and the province. Walters described his party as a centrist alternative, distinct from the Liberal Party of Canada and embodying Saskatchewan's tradition of "prairie Liberalism".

On Feb. 5th, 2022, Walters organized a rally in front of the Saskatchewan Legislature to oppose Premier Scott Moe's immediate rolling back of COVID-19 mandates, tracking, and tracing. Walters also launched the "Accountability Saskatchewan" initiative, collecting signatures to trigger a plebiscite on a public inquiry into the provincial government's handling of COVID-19. The petition was initially available only online and on social media, provoking an official ruling from Elections Saskatchewan affirming the validity of electronic signatures in Saskatchewan.

Party leaders
Walter Scott (August 16, 1905 – October 20, 1916)
William M. Martin (October 20, 1916 – April 5, 1922)
Charles A. Dunning (April 5, 1922 – February 26, 1926)
James G. Gardiner (February 26, 1926 – October 31, 1935)
William John Patterson (October 31, 1935 – August 6, 1946)
Walter Tucker (August 6, 1946 – November 26, 1954)
Alexander H. McDonald (November 26, 1954 – September 24, 1959)
Ross Thatcher (September 24, 1959 – July 22, 1971)
David Steuart (December 11, 1971 – December 11, 1976) House Leader (July 22, 1971 - December 11, 1971)
Ted Malone (December 11, 1976 – June 13, 1981)
Ralph Goodale (June 13, 1981 – October 7, 1988)
Vacant (October 7, 1988 - April 2, 1989) (Jack Wiebe was party president)
Lynda Haverstock (April 2, 1989 – November 12, 1995)
Ron Osika (November 12, 1995 - November 24, 1996, interim)
Jim Melenchuk (November 24, 1996 – October 27, 2001)
David Karwacki (October 27, 2001 – December 21, 2007)
Frank Proto (December 21, 2007 – February 21, 2009, interim)
Ryan Bater (February 21, 2009 – March 12, 2012)
Greg Gallagher (March 12, 2012 – December 16, 2013, interim)
Darrin Lamoureux (December 16, 2013 – August 21, 2014, interim) and (August 21, 2014 – September 9, 2017)
 Tara Jijian (September 24, 2017 – May 5, 2018)
 Naveed Anwar  (May 5, 2018 – September 2020)
 Robert Rudachyk (September 28, 2020 – October 16, 2021) 
Jeff Walters (October 16, 2021 – Present)

Scott, Martin and Dunning were Premiers for the duration of their party's leadership. Patterson was Premier for all but two years of his leadership. Thatcher became Premier after five years as the Leader of the Opposition and remained leader until the end of his Premiership.

Election results

See also
Saskatchewan Liberal Party leadership conventions
List of Saskatchewan political parties
Politics of Saskatchewan

References

External links

Liberal Party
Liberal parties in Canada
Organizations based in Regina, Saskatchewan